Foia Foia (Foyafoya), or Minanibai, is a Papuan language of Papua New Guinea, spoken in an area near Omati River mouth in Ikobi Kairi and Goaribari Census districts (Gulf Province).

Mahigi, a Foia Foia dialect documented in a word list by Cridland (1924), is now extinct.

Locations
Foia Foia is spoken in Bibisa village, Bamu Rural LLG, Western Province, Papua New Guinea.

Minanbai is spoken in Moka and Pepeha villages of West Kikori Rural LLG, Gulf Province.

Phonology

Vowels

Consonants

Bibliography
Word lists
Carr, Philip J. 1991 Foyafoya (Bibisa, W.P. at Kamusi), Hoyahoya (Matakaia, W.P. at Gagoro), Hoyahoya/Hoiahoia (Ukusi-Koperami, W.P. two young men visiting Torobina). Manuscript.
Z’graggen, John A. 1975. Comparative wordlists of the Gulf District and adjacent Areas. In: Richard Loving (ed.), Comparative Wordlists I. 5–116. Ukarumpa: SIL-PNG. (Rearranged version of Franklin ed. 1973: 541–592) with typographical errors.)
Franklin, Karl J. 1973. Appendices. In: Franklin (ed.), 539–592.
Johnston, H. L. C. 1920. Vocabulary of Eme-Eme. British New Guinea Annual Report 1919–1920: 120.

References

External links 
Foia Foia. New Guinea World.

Inland Gulf languages
Languages of Papua New Guinea